Church Point (French: Pointe-de-l'Église) is an unincorporated community located on Saint Mary's Bay in the District of Clare, Digby County, Nova Scotia, Canada.

Local facilities 
Church Point is home to Université Sainte-Anne (about four hundred to five hundred students), the only French post-secondary institution in Nova-Scotia. It was founded on September 1, 1890, by Gustave Blanche, a Eudist Father. The university was named after Saint Anne, the mother of the Virgin Mary. Sainte-Anne is known for its French Immersion programs. The program is very strict about using immersion to learn the French language (The French-Only Rule). At the official opening of the session, the student is asked to sign a pledge agreeing to speak French at all times during the program. As soon as the pledge is signed, the use of French is mandatory at all times. If a student is caught speaking English they will receive a warning. The third warning results in expulsion from the program, without a refund. The rural location of the university means there are few opportunities for students to congregate outside of earshot, compared to more urban campuses where off-campus outings would provide ample opportunity for communication in English.

However, Church Point is known primarily for the tallest wooden church in North America, Sainte Marie Church (French: Église Sainte-Marie), which is located just north of the university. Since the year 2000 this church is a registered museum. A Visitor Centre, housing an Acadian interpretive centre and visitor information, is located on the university campus. An Acadian Odyssey Monument commemorating the founding of Clare was erected in September 2015, and is situated in front of the Visitor Centre.

Also on the university campus houses the local arena and the home of the Clare Acadiens hockey association.

History 

The Catholic Church Sainte-Marie, was built from 1903 to 1905. Today it is on the "Evangeline Trail" and borders the campus of Université Sainte-Anne, the only French language university in Nova Scotia. Pointe-de-l'Église continues to constitute part of a thriving Acadian French linguistic presence in Nova Scotia.

Church Point Lighthouse 
A Lighthouse was built in 1874 by G. S. Parker. It was a white wooden pepper-shaker-type tower standing 9.4 meters tall and topped by a red lantern room. The light was discontinued in 1984, while the dwelling was removed from the site sometime around 1953 when the light was electrified and made unwatched. The neglected Church Point Lighthouse was destroyed by a powerful spring storm in March 2014. A “replica” of the original lighthouse was built and opened to the public in 2017.

External links 
 Sainte Marie Church, Church Point, Nova Scotia, historicplaces.ca
Church Point Lighthouse, lighthousefriends.com

References 

Communities in Digby County, Nova Scotia
General Service Areas in Nova Scotia